Antoine Philippe de La Trémoïlle, Prince of Talmont (27 September 1765 in Paris - 27 January 1794 in Laval) was a French noble and royalist notable for his military involvement against the French Revolution.

Early life
Antoine Philippe de La Trémoïlle was Prince of Talmont and second son of Jean Bretagne Charles de La Trémoille, 8th duc de Thouars, last count of Laval and baron de Vitré et de Marie-Maximilienne-Louise de Salm-Kyrbourg. He resided in the Castle of Laval, and was a commander of the cavalry of catholic and royal armies during the French Revolution.

He married Henriette-Louise-Françoise-Angélique d'Argouges on 23 January 1785.

The Poitou Confederation and emigration
Until the end of 1791, Antoine Philippe was noticed for his restless character. He joined counterrevolutionary circles (Poitou Confederation) in Poitou in the end of 1791. It was a failure which resulted in an emigration to England to secure the interests of his party. He then went to the Rhine and joined émigrés. The count Marie Pierre Louis de Frotté and him took some service for the Chevaliers-dragons de la couronne. He participated in a first campaign in the princes' army for the Count of Artois (later king Charles X of France). He was sent to France with a new plan of insurrection in the Western provinces.

At the execution of the king, he hoped to start a movement in Paris. He failed, and stayed in the village of Boulogne, close to Paris, with his brother the abbot Charles-Godefroy de La Trémoille. Upon learning about the counterrevolution movement of a part of Brittany and Maine, which preceded that of Vendée, on March 10, he got himself a passport with a fake name, and another with the name of his brother. He went on the travel Normandy, Maine and Anjou to recruit partisans.

Royalist insurrection
He was arrested on 20 May by the municipality of Noyant-sous-le-Lude, and sent from there to Baugé, to be transferred to a prison in Angers, from which the Committee of Public Safety was informed of his presence. His brother, abbot of Trémoille, managed to organize a conspiracy in the National Convention. Chambon, a member of The Mountain, was designated to interrogate the prince and under a pretext of bringing him to Paris, he handed him to the Vendéens. Thus he managed to escape thanks to this plan well-conceived by his own brother from the inside of the National Convention.

During his transfer from Angers to Laval, his own guards allowed his escape, and peasants escorted him towards Saumur, which was then held by the royalist Vendéens since June 1793 (see Battle of Saumur). In one of his interrogations, he said he was simply released by the Maine-et-Loire department.

His arrival in Saumur caused a huge sensation. He was named commander of the cavalry of the Catholic and Royal Army and took part in the superior counsel of the army.

Vendée
At the victory in Nantes, on 28 June 1793, he proved his courage along with Jacques Cathelineau and Maurice d'Elbée, by checking the ranks, bringing back to combat discouraged Vendéens and by being wounded whilst leading the charge of the royal cavalry. Back in Vendée, he participated in nearly every action in the first stages of the war. After the First Battle of Châtillon, and the repeated defeats of the Vendéens, he insisted that they should at least become masters of the Loire passage and entrance in Brittany.

During the crisis in which the army of Vendée was pushed back towards the Loire, the Prince of Talmont was detached with 4,000 royalists to guard the Saint-Florent post. After the Battle of Cholet, he concentrated on protecting the road of the Vendéens on the right bank of the Loire.

Virée de Galerne

In the counsel, he was opposed to the resolution of entering Vendée, and thought it was better to head to Saint-Malo where they could receive aide promised by the English. The ancient authority of his family in the Laval county ordered the army to march in that direction.

The first Chouans joined the Vendéens at their arrival at Laval, and a considerable troop was recruited called Petite-Vendée, which followed the army under the son of the previous count of Laval. Antoine Philippe, along with Donnissant and the abbot Bernier, signed at Laval for £900,000 in paper money. He participated in the victory of the Battle of Entrames.

Their determination being successful, with Fleuriot he took command of the column marching from Laval to Vitré, where he hoped to recruit more troops, and retreated back to the royal army in Fougères which marched to the Cotentin and besieged Granville.

Taking the town depended on the issue of Francis Rawdon-Hastings' expedition, in charge of helping the royalists, who was one day before sailing from England to Jersey. But already the Vendéens were pushed back during their attack on Granville. Discouraged they wanted to retreat back to Vendée and were even in revolt against their leaders. In this confusion, Antoine Philippe along with Beauvollier, de Solérac and Étienne-Alexandre Bernier, took the coast to sail off.

Hearing the news, the Vendéens protested, considering the prince's act as desertion. They detached a cavalry unit under Stofflet to stop him. The detachment encircled the prince and retrieve him to the camp with those who had followed him.

"The explained that they had only taken a fishing boat in order to sail to Jersey and hurry English aid, and save a few women".

The other testimonies differ on the projected escape of the prince.

A few days later, the prince gave new examples of his valor in the Battle of Dol ; he alone, when most divisions of the royal army were fleeing to Dol, held firmly with a few men until Henri de La Rochejaquelein joined him. Talmont followed the army at the siege of Angers, which was as disastrous as in Granville. In the Battle of Le Mans on 14 December, he charged under fire the enemy hussars at the entrance of the town. After his defeat, the royal army which couldn't retreat to the Loire had lost 7,000 men.

Illusions
Bravely but without any illusions, he continued fighting with the rest of the Catholic and Royal Army which couldn't pass the Loire. He joined with Henri de La Rochejaquelein who had passed the river at Ancenis with the other main generals, and came to find his troop at Blain to bring him back.

But Fleuriot was named chief general, and Talmont was angry of this preference and left the army. He considered himself free of any obligations and left through Derval, La Guerche and the Pertre forest to join Jean Chouan or to head to the coast. A few bretons enrolled by Joseph de Puisaye couldn't give him information on the Chouans in Mayenne ; Puisaye showed no hurry in relating to the prince. He continued his journey towards Normandy.

Arrest
In company of three other men, he was walking through fields near Laval and Fougères, dressed as a peasant, when he stumbled upon the national guard of Bazouges, on 31 December 1793 in the village of Malagra. A sum of £30,000 was found on them, as well as a few luxurious objects, and a passport made 4 days before by the Ernée municipality.

General Beaufort had them sent to him at Fougères, without anyone knowing who they were. A young girl in Saint-Jacques, seeing them pass, cried out : "it's the prince of Talmont!". Beaufort thus interrogated him.

He was transferred to Rennes on 2 January 1794 and was thoroughly interrogated by François Joachim Esnue-Lavallée, after which the prisoner asked his transfer to Paris in a letter to the National Convention. Chained, he is thrown in a cell where he writes to general Rossignol. Administrators, generals, commissioners, insulted their victims, especially the prince. But they were frightened that the prince, infected with typhus, would die in prison. Order came to transfer him to Paris.

Esnue-Lavallée put him on trial to the Vaugeois commission in Vitré, on 26 January. He arrived there almost dying, was subject to a new interrogation which he refused to sign, and waited to be trialed in front of the National Convention. He was immediately sentenced to death, protested the following day and asked for a transfer to Paris having ideas of general pacification to present. Instead of that, the commission took six artillery horses to transport him to Laval.

It is said that Jean Chouan attempted to save him, but he was misinformed. The convoy, heavily escorted, arrived in Laval at nightfall and the execution took place then and there. His head was subject to different desecration, it was placed on a chandelier by Jean-Louis Guilbert, former priest and member of the revolutionary commission, then it was put on a pike and exposed over the gates of the Laval castle. Two days later, the prince's head was buried in the courtyard of the castle.

His only son became colonel of the 5th regiment of Hussars, and died on 7 November 1815.

Ancestry

Sources
« Antoine-Philippe de La Trémoïlle », in Louis-Gabriel Michaud, Biographie universelle ancienne et moderne : histoire par ordre alphabétique de la vie publique et privée de tous les hommes avec la collaboration de plus de 300 savants et littérateurs français ou étrangers, 2e édition, 1843–1865
« Antoine-Philippe de La Trémoïlle », in Alphonse-Victor Angot, Ferdinand Gaugain, Dictionnaire historique, topographique et biographique de la Mayenne, Goupil, 1900–1910

1765 births
1794 deaths
Politicians from Paris
French counter-revolutionaries
French Royalist military leaders killed in the French Revolutionary Wars
Royalist military leaders of the War in the Vendée
Executed people from Île-de-France
Antoine-Philippe
French princes
 Cent
French people executed by guillotine during the French Revolution
18th-century French people
People of Byzantine descent